The Light Rail Transit Line 1, commonly referred to as LRT Line 1 or LRT-1, is a light rapid transit system line in Metro Manila, Philippines, operated by Light Rail Manila Corporation (LRMC) and owned by the Light Rail Transit Authority (LRTA) as part of the Manila Light Rail Transit System. Originally referred to as Metrorail and the Yellow Line, LRT Line 1 was reclassified to be the Green Line in 2012. Although it has the characteristics of light rail, such as with the type of rolling stock used, it is more akin to a rapid transit system owing to its total grade separation and high passenger throughput.

A 1977 study conducted by Freeman Fox and Associates suggested a street-level railway in Manila but the government revised this recommendation to an elevated system. In 1980, President Ferdinand Marcos created the LRTA and construction of the line began the following year. With the opening of its first segment in 1984, it became the first rapid transit service in Southeast Asia.

From 2016 to 2020, the line was the busiest among Metro Manila's three rapid transit lines, after MRT Line 3 and LRT Line 2. It became the busiest when Line 3, which was the busiest prior to 2014, experienced a decline in ridership due to daily incidents attributed to poor maintenance. In 2021, LRT Line 1 became the second busiest among the three lines after the MRT Line 3 regained its position as the busiest line in the metro due to the increase in ridership after a comprehensive rehabilitation.

The line is integrated with the public transit system in Metro Manila, and passengers also take various forms of road-based public transport, such as buses and jeepneys, to and from a station to reach their intended destination. Although the line aimed to reduce traffic congestion and travel times in Metro Manila, the transportation system has only been partially successful due to the rising number of motor vehicles and rapid urbanization. Expanding the network's revenue line to accommodate more passengers, through extension projects, is set on resolving this problem.

Route
The line is predominantly aligned to the path of Taft Avenue (Radial Road 2) which was chosen largely due to its straight course. Later on, as Taft Avenue ends, it shifts to Rizal Avenue and Rizal Avenue Extension (Radial Road 9) then turning right on EDSA before ending at the corner of North and West Avenues and EDSA. The line links the cities of Quezon City, Caloocan, Manila, and Pasay, with the upcoming stations passing through the cities of Parañaque, Las Piñas, and Bacoor in Cavite.

Stations
The line serves 20 stations along its route. A twenty-first station is yet to be constructed. However, the planned Malvar station was completely shelved by the Aquino administration.

No stations are connected to other rapid transit lines within the paid areas, though that is set to change when the North Triangle Common Station, which has interchanges to MRT Line 3 and MRT Line 7, opens in 2023.

Operations and services
The line operates from 4:30 a.m. PST (UTC+8) until 10:15 p.m. on weekdays, and 4:30 a.m. until 9:45 p.m on weekends and holidays. It operates almost every day of the year unless otherwise announced. Special schedules are announced via the PA system in every station and also in newspapers and other mass media. During Holy Week, a public holiday in the Philippines, the rail line is closed for annual maintenance, owing to fewer commuters and traffic around the metro. Normal operation resumes after Easter Sunday. During the Christmas and year-end holidays, the operating hours of the line are shortened due to the low ridership of the line during the holidays.

History

Planning and funding

The 1977 Metro Manila Transport, Land Use and Development Planning Project (MMETROPLAN), a fourteen-month study conducted by Freeman Fox and Associates and funded by the World Bank, recommended the construction of a street-level light rail line in Manila. Following a review by the Ministry of Transportation and Communications, later the Department of Transportation (DOTr), the proposal was revised to an elevated railway in order to avoid building over the city's many intersections, while the option of constructing the line underground was also rejected due to the high water table in Manila. This raised the project's cost from ₱1.5 billion to ₱2 billion. An alignment along Rizal and Taft avenues, which spanned from Monumento, Caloocan in the north to Baclaran, Pasay in the south, was selected because it followed a relatively straight path for most of its route. On July 12, 1980, President Ferdinand Marcos created the Light Rail Transit Authority (LRTA) and assigned First Lady and Governor of Metro Manila Imelda Marcos as its chairman. While the LRTA confined its roles to policy making, fare regulation, and future planning, the line's operations were assigned to Metro, Inc., a sister company of Meralco. The line came to be referred to as Metrorail.

The Belgian Government granted a ₱300 million soft and interest-free loan for the project's construction, with a repayment period of 30 years. Additional funding was later sourced from a ₱700 million loan, provided by a Belgian consortium consisting of ACEC, La Brugeoise et Nivelles, Tractionnel Engineering International, and Transurb Consult. The consortium also supplied the line's first light rail vehicles, power control, signalling, and telecommunications, as well as provided training and technical assistance. Designed as a public utility rather than a profit center, the line was expected to incur a deficit through 1993, but complete its repayments within a period of 20 years.

Construction

The government-owned Construction Development Corporation of the Philippines was the project's sole contractor. Single column cast-in-place concrete piers carrying precast concrete T-girders and a concrete deck slab were used for the original line from Monumento to Baclaran. The columns are spaced apart by  rising from a cap on top of bored or driven concrete piles.

Driven piles were originally used for 80 percent of the project, with spread footings being used for the remaining portion. However, during construction, it was determined that bored piles should be utilized in some areas to mitigate noise and avoid potential damage to nearby buildings. Additionally, the original use of stockpiled precast piles caused clutter on the streets during construction.

In 1981, an economic recession and the government's inability to provide counterpart funds for civil works and right-of-way acquisition, which amounted to 60 percent of the project's total cost, led to a delay in construction. Work finally began in September of that year along Taft Avenue, between Epifanio de los Santos Avenue (EDSA) and Libertad Street. In order to make way for Carriedo station and a segment of tracks approaching the Pasig River, a department store and a classroom building owned by FEATI University were demolished.

Opening
The southern section, between the Baclaran to United Nations stations, was inaugurated on September 11, 1984, and commercial operation along this section commenced on December 1. The line became fully operational on May 12, 1985, when the northern section between Central Terminal and Monumento opened. During the first several years, two-car trains that could accommodate up to 748 passengers were utilized. This amounted to a capacity of 20,000 passengers per direction.

Capacity expansions

First phase

During the 1990s, the Line 1 reached its capacity due to traffic congestion and air pollution. In 1990, the Line 1 fell so far into disrepair due to premature wear and tear that trains headed to Central Terminal station had to slow to a crawl to avoid further damage to the support beams below as cracks reportedly began to appear. The premature aging of Line 1 led to an extensive refurbishing and structural capacity expansion program with a help of Japan's official development assistance.

The capacity expansion project was one of the flagship projects of the administration of President Fidel V. Ramos. A loan agreement for the first phase of the capacity expansion project was signed in 1994. In August 1996, a consortium of Marubeni Corporation, Adtranz, and ABB was awarded the contract and was signed the following September. In line with the introduction of the four-car trains, the station platforms were also extended. The project was completed in 2002.

During the first phase of the capacity expansion, a labor strike was launched by employees of Meralco Transit Organization (METRO, Inc.) in July 2000 as their operations and maintenance contract was about to expire. It paralyzed the operations of the line for a week. The Light Rail Transit Authority decided not to renew its contract with METRO, Inc. that expired on July 31, 2000, and the former assumed operational responsibility.

Second phase

Another capacity expansion project was initiated in April 2000 during the administration of President Joseph Estrada due to the high demand of passengers in line with the completion of the MRT Line 3 (and eventually, LRT Line 2). Funded through an ₱8.893-billion loan from the Japan Bank for International Cooperation, the second phase of the capacity expansion project is divided into two packages. Package A involves the procurement of twelve four-car trains, upgrades to the signalling and communications equipment, and upgrades to the stations and depot. The installation of equipment for the automatic fare collection system was also included in the capacity expansion project.

North extension

With the completion of the first phase of the MRT Line 3 in 1999, there were plans to extend Line 3 towards  station (Phase 2) to create a seamless rail loop around Metro Manila. However, the extension was shelved by then-President Gloria Macapagal Arroyo in favor of a  extension of the LRT-1 to the MRT-3  station. However, due to disputes in the common station's location, the station would only begin construction on September 29, 2017. The extension was part of the MRT-LRT Closing the Loop project under the Arroyo administration.

In September 2008, during construction,  station was proposed and was met with controversies between the Caloocan local government, the general public, and the Light Rail Transit Authority. The station was approved in July 2009. Though it was reported that the feasibility study for the station was completed, construction has yet to start.

The project was originally divided into three packages. Package A covered the construction of the viaduct while Package B covered the construction of the stations. Package C would cover the electro-mechanical systems in which includes the power supply, signalling and telecommunication systems, and railway track works. Several modifications were made in Packages A and C. Package A would be divided into two packages: Package A1, which covers the construction of the viaduct from Monumento to Balintawak, while Package A2 covered the construction of the viaduct from Balintawak to North Avenue. The joint venture of First Balfour and DMCI was awarded the contract for the viaduct and stations for the north extension project. Package C, on the other hand, would cover the power supply system, overhead catenary system, and station equipment. Package C was awarded to the joint venture of Miescor and GTC. Its sub-components, the signalling system, telecommunication systems, fare systems, and railway track works were contracted as four separate contracts. The signalling contract was awarded to the joint venture of DMCI, Beta Electric, and Tewet. The communications contract, on the other hand, was awarded to the Philippine subsidiary of Alcatel-Lucent. The fare systems contract was awarded to AP Trans SA, and the track works contract was awarded to the joint venture of Daxi and Frateur-De Pourcq.

The project was intended to integrate the LRT Line 1 and MRT Line 3 operations. Structure gauge tests were conducted in the extension by February 2010. The project's consultant, MetroLink Joint Venture, found that the LRT Line 1 trains can run on MRT Line 3 tracks. Balintawak station opened on March 22, 2010, while Roosevelt station opened seven months later, on October 22.

The Tewet Group of Germany, together with its signalling partner BBR Verkehrstechnik, conducted the signalling integration of the original line and north extension. Integration works were completed in May 2011, while the integration works passed inspection tests by TÜV Rheinland in June 2011.

To integrate the operations of the LRT Line 1 and MRT Line 3, the then-Department of Transportation and Communications, under Secretary Jose de Jesus, launched an auction for a temporary five-year operations and maintenance contract for the two lines. The bidding was set by July 2011. Over 21 companies from around the world expressed interest to bid which included Metro Pacific Investments, Sumitomo Corporation, Siemens, DMCI Holdings, San Miguel Corporation, and others. After de Jesus resigned from the DOTC, his successor, Mar Roxas, halted the auction process and was later shelved.

Privatization
A plan to privatize the line was pursued as part of the south extension project. The bidding was set for August 2013, but failed. The project was rebidded, and on September 12, 2014, the operation and maintenance of LRT Line 1 and the construction of a  extension project to Bacoor, Cavite was awarded to the Light Rail Manila Corporation (LRMC), a joint venture company of Metro Pacific's Metro Pacific Light Rail Corporation (MPLRC), Ayala Corporation's AC Infrastructure Holdings Corporation (AC Infra), and the Philippine Investment Alliance for Infrastructure's Macquarie Infrastructure Holdings (Philippines) PTE Ltd. (MIHPL) (with Sumitomo Corporation following in May 2020). The consortium signed a concession agreement with the DOTr and LRTA on October 2, 2014. LRMC contracted the operation and maintenance of the line for 20 years to RATP Dev under its subsidiary RATP Dev Transdev Asia, a joint venture between Transdev and RATP Dev on December 8, 2014. The 32-year concession started on September 12, 2015.

Rehabilitation
A rail replacement program commenced in 2016, as a continuation of the previous rail replacement program completed by the Light Rail Transit Authority. LRMC signed a contract with First Balfour for the structural restoration project of Line 1 on April 19, 2017, and in November 2018, LRMC tapped First Balfour and MRail, a subsidiary of Meralco for the rehabilitation of rectifier substations.

LRMC has also rehabilitated the first and second-generation trains to add more trains servicing the line.

Station facilities, amenities, and services

All stations in Line 1 are elevated, with the exception of Zapote station.

Station layout and accessibility
Most stations are composed of only one level, accessible from the street below by stairway, containing the station's concourse and platform areas separated by fare gates. Some stations tend to have a concourse level below the platforms. The single-level stations of Line 1, however, was not built with accessibility in mind, due to the lack of barrier-free facilities such as escalators and elevators. Some trains have spaces for passengers using wheelchairs.

The last car of each train are also designated as "green zones", where folding bicycle users can ride with their bikes.

All stations have side platforms except for Baclaran, which has one side and one island platform. Due to the high patronage of the line, part of the platform corresponding to the front car of the train is cordoned off for the use of women, children, elderly and disabled passengers.

Shops and services
Inside the concourse of some stations are stalls or shops where people can buy food or drinks. Stalls vary by station, and some have fast food stalls. The number of stalls also varies by station, and some stations tend to have a wide variety.

Stations such as Monumento and Baclaran are connected to or are near shopping malls and/or other large shopping areas, where commuters are offered more shopping varieties.

Ridership
The current designed daily ridership of the line is 560,000 passengers and currently aims to increase the number of passengers being served on the line to more than 800,000 passengers, as the line's south extension is set to be fully operational by 2027.

On January 9, 2012, the line served a record 620,987 passengers during the Feast of the Black Nazarene ( station is near to the Quiapo Church), and since the day falls on a working weekday. In 2018, the line carried 300,000 to 500,000 passengers daily, due to the increased number of trains, from 86 vehicles to 113 vehicles available for daily trips. This gradually reduces the waiting time of passengers from 5 minutes to as much as 2–3.5 minutes. It also carried as much as 14.63 million passengers monthly in 2018.

Rolling stock

The line at various stages in its history has used different configurations of two-car, three-car, and four-car trainsets.  The two-car trains are the original first-generation BN and ACEC trains (railway cars numbered from 1000). Most were transformed into three-car trains, although some two-car trains remain in service. The four-car trains are the more modern second-generation Hyundai Precision / Adtranz (1100) and third-generation Kinki Sharyo / Nippon Sharyo (1200) trains. There are 139 railway cars grouped into 40 trains serving the line: 63 of these are first-generation cars, 28 second-generation, and 48 third-generation. One train car (1037) was severely damaged in the Rizal Day bombings in 2000 and was subsequently decommissioned.

Until 2011, all trains ran at the maximum speed until it was downgraded to  due to the deteriorating condition of the railway tracks, except for the north extension which continued running on the  maximum speed.

The line's fleet is being modernized to cope with increasing numbers of passengers. In the initial phase of its capacity expansion program completed in 1999, the line's seven four-car second-generation trains were commissioned providing an increased train capacity of 1,358 passengers while the original two-car trains capable of holding 748 passengers were transformed into three-car trains with room for 1,122. As part of the second phase of expansion, twelve new trains made in Japan by Kinki Sharyo and Nippon Sharyo were purchased in 2005 and were introduced in December 2006, providing a capacity of 1,388 passengers. The fourth-generation trains, ordered in 2017 with Japanese funding for the south extension project to replace the first-generation trains, have not been in use due to defects found in most of the new trains.

Prior to 1999, the first-generation trains were notorious for its lack of air conditioning, relying instead on forced-air roof ventilation for cooling. This however resulted in hot and stuffy rides. Although the entry of the second-generation trains in 1999 marked the introduction of air-conditioned trains in the line, the problem was fully addressed after a preparatory rehabilitation program completed in 2001 allowed the installation of air conditioners to the older rolling stock in 2004.

LRMC has also built an in-house laboratory for production, manufacturing, fabrication and repair of train parts that are no longer available in the market.

The Passenger Assist Railway Display System, a passenger information system powered by LCD screens installed near the ceiling of the train that shows news, advertisements, current train location, arrivals and station layouts, are already installed in the third-generation trains, along with the trains of Line 2 and the first-generation trains of Line 3.

Depot
The line maintains an at-grade depot in Baclaran, Pasay. It serves as the center of the operations and maintenance of the line. It is connected to the mainline through a spur line. Expansion works were completed after the depot was inaugurated on February 23, 2022.

A satellite depot is being constructed in Zapote as part of the line’s south extension project. When completed, the satellite depot will handle 72 light rail vehicles.

Other infrastructure

Signalling

Throughout its history, the line used different signalling systems. The line currently uses the Alstom Atlas 100 solution based on ETCS Level 1.

The original signalling system used in the LRT Line 1 was based on fixed block and relay type trackside systems. Trains had an automatic train stop system that activates if the train passes by a red signal or over-speeding. Based on a procurement plan published by the Light Rail Transit Authority, most of the signalling equipment, including track circuits, were supplied by ACEC.

In 2007, as part of a capacity expansion project, the signalling system was replaced with a signalling and train control system based on automatic train protection (ATP) and automatic train supervision (ATS) using Siemens technology. The ATP system monitors the speed of the trains, while the ATS system directs train operations. Prior to the 2022 upgrade, the signalling system was designed to operate at a headway of 112 seconds. Aside from the ATP and ATS systems, its subsystems include train detection through axle counters, and microprocessor-based interlocking.

The signalling system was again upgraded as part of the line's south extension. Alstom was awarded a contract in February 2016 to supply the signalling and communications systems for the line. Alstom supplied the Atlas 100 solution based on ETCS Level 1. The testing and commissioning phase of the upgraded signalling system started in November 2021 and was completed on February 1, 2022.

Tracks

The tracks have two types: ballasted and slab tracks.

The tracks in the original  line consist of  rails designed to the EB 50T rail profile, while the tracks in the future extension line consist of  rails designed to the UIC 54 rail profile.

Due to the deterioration of the rail tracks in the original line, speed restrictions were implemented in 2011 except for the north extension. In 2012, a contract to replace  of rails was awarded to the joint venture of Oriental and Motolite Marketing Corporation, Korail, Erin-Marty Fabricators Company, Inc., and Jorgman Construction and Development Corporation. However, there were delays in the project implementation until February 2014, when the then-Department of Transportation and Communications issued a notice to proceed for the joint venture. The first phase of the replacement started in 2014, while the rails at Monumento station were replaced in March 2015. The first phase of the rail replacement was completed in December 2015. The second and final phase of replacement works commenced in August 2016 by the Light Rail Manila Corporation, which contracted Joratech to replace  of rails and was completed in 2017.

Extensions

South extension

An extension of LRT Line 1 to the south, known as the South Extension Project or the Cavite Extension Project, is under construction and will serve the areas of Parañaque to Cavite. The extension will span from the Quirino Avenue, Harrison Avenue, and Taft Avenue Extension intersection, then would travel down from Redemptorist Road, Roxas Boulevard, and Manila–Cavite Expressway, afterwards, it will traverse through the Parañaque River and will enter Ninoy Aquino Avenue until reaching and traversing the C5 Extension Road; and will once again enter Coastal Road, crossing the Las Piñas-Bacoor Boundary Bridge along the Zapote River, and traverse through the Alabang–Zapote Road and Aguinaldo Highway intersection, until reaching the Niog station located along the Bacoor Boulevard at Bacoor, Cavite. The extension project would add 8 stations covering  of new elevated railway sections and would be the third rail line extending outside the Metro Manila area (after the east extension of Line 2 and the construction of Line 7). The project is divided in two phases—Phase 1 covers five stations from Redemptorist to Dr. Santos, while Phase 2 covers the remaining three stations from Las Piñas to Niog.

The project was first approved by the National Economic and Development Authority in 2000, while the Implementing Agreement for the project was approved in 2002, to be undertaken by SNC-Lavalin as a public-private partnership project. The proposal however was subsequently terminated in 2006. In the same year, the government worked with advisers (International Finance Corporation, White & Case, Halcrow and others) to conduct an open-market invitation to tender for the extension and for a 40-year concession to run the extended line. However, the project was shelved months before Gloria Macapagal Arroyo would end her term as President.

The plans for the southern extension project were restarted as early as 2012 and was expected to begin construction in 2014 but was delayed due to right of way issues. The issues were resolved in 2016 and on May 4, 2017, the groundbreaking for the ₱64.915 billion ($1.36 billion) South Extension Project was held, with the assistance of the Light Rail Manila Corporation and the Japan International Cooperation Agency. The extension project also features the construction of three intermodal facilities, one satellite depot located at Zapote, and mass upgrades to the existing Baclaran depot. The project is expected to cater more than 800,000 passengers daily once completed, with the DOTr secretary Arthur Tugade projecting the early completion of the project to be within 2020.

The line would be extended from Parañaque southwards, connecting Las Piñas and Bacoor to the Mega Manila railway network. Civil works on the extension began on May 7, 2019 after the right-of-way acquisitions were cleared. The construction of the extension line will be built using a full span launching method, renowned as one of the fastest methods of construction for bridges and elevated viaducts that cuts time and total land space needed for construction. A total of 203 pi-girders were used for the construction of the extension's first phase, the last of which was laid down along Redemptorist Road, Baclaran on February 7, 2022. The LRMC partnered with Bouygues Construction for the civil works, Alstom for the installation of the signalling and communication systems, and the RATP Dev Transdev Asia for the overall engineering, procurement, consultation, construction and assistance services for the project. The extension project will also serve as the first railway line to use the new construction method.

The LRT Line 1 South Extension Project will consist of the following eight stations:
Redemptorist – Parañaque
Manila International Airport – Parañaque
Asia World – Parañaque
Ninoy Aquino – Parañaque
Dr. Santos – Parañaque
Las Piñas – Las Piñas
Zapote – along the boundaries of Bacoor and Las Piñas
Niog – Bacoor

Plans were also laid out to include 2 additional stations for the extension project:
Manuyo Uno station - Las Piñas
Talaba station - Bacoor

, the project is 75.3% complete. Phase 1 of the extension (from Redemptorist station to Dr. Santos station) is slated to be operational by September 2024, with full operations by 2027.

Second north extension

The original north extension until  station will be extended to the under-construction North Triangle Common Station. The project site of the common station was disputed for years until an agreement with the stakeholders was signed in January 2017. Construction of the station began on September 29, 2017 and is planned to open on July 2023.

Incidents and accidents

Rizal Day bombings

On December 30, 2000, during the Rizal Day, a 1000 class LRV train (Car number 1037) was involved in the Rizal Day bombings at Blumentritt station. The attack on the line killed some 22 people and injured hundreds. Eight members of both Jemaah Islamiyah and the Moro Islamic Liberation Front (MILF), which include Hambal, Asia's most wanted man, and Fathur Rahman al-Ghozi, were charged with plotting and masterminding the attacks in 2003, some three years after the attacks. Three suspects were put on trial, with al-Ghozi receiving 17 years in prison due to the illegal possession of explosives.  Al-Ghozi later died in a firefight after attempting to escape from prison.

Other incidents
 On January 3, 2008, a fire blazed at a shopping mall in Baclaran. Due to the smoke, the Baclaran station was temporarily closed. A provisional service was implemented between EDSA and Monumento (at the time, the north extension was not opened yet), with southbound trains still proceeding towards Baclaran to only serve as a turn back siding. The station remained closed the following day until it was reopened a few days later.
 On August 11, 2008, a fire blazed in a mall near the Baclaran station. The station closed to the public until the station was reopened on August 13.
 On December 8, 2008, a train encountered a glitch while approaching Carriedo station.
 On February 18, 2011, two trains (1G and 3G) collided near Roosevelt Station in Quezon City at the reversing tracks, around a kilometer away to the east. There were no passengers onboard when the incident happened. The cause of the collision is yet to be determined, whether due to driver error or technical malfunction.
 On April 15, 2011, a door malfunction disrupted the operations of Line 1 at Blumentritt station.
 On June 21, 2011, at 8:00 AM, a train suffered a short-circuit in one of its electrical components at Libertad station. On the same day, at 2:23 PM, a power cable was hit by lightning, disrupting the line's operations for three hours.
 On August 30, 2012, at 5:50 AM, a woman committed suicide after jumping in front of an approaching train at EDSA station. Operations were disrupted until operations resumed at 9:40 AM.
 On December 21, 2012, a train stalled at the Monumento station.
 On November 14, 2014, a signalling fault at Roosevelt station limited the operations between Monumento and Baclaran stations. The situation normalized at 3:57 PM.
 On May 23, 2015, thousands of passengers were stranded after two trains (1G and 3G) collided near the Monumento station. A train driver was hurt after the impact caused his head to slam into the dashboard of the train. The accident, later revealed to be caused by power fluctuation that affected the signalling system, forced passengers to alight from the station until services was restored around 1 pm at the same day.
 On March 10, 2016, a door in a 1G train car was left open while running between Central Terminal and Pedro Gil stations. The problem was fixed at the Pedro Gil station.
 On March 22, 2016, the doors of a 1G train car at the Central Terminal station failed to open, leaving passengers trapped inside the train.
 On September 26, 2016, a faulty door in a 1G train car suddenly slammed shut in less than a second. No one was injured.
 On November 6, 2017, a man's leg got stuck when a train door closed at the Gil Puyat station. The man was dragged at the platform when the train was moving, leaving the man with severe injuries. The man was then sent to a nearby hospital, where he was confined in an intensive care unit. According to a report, a number of trains, particularly the 1000 class (1G) trains, do not have sensors, that detects an object between doors.
 On November 27, 2017, a 1100 class (2G) train door malfunctioned after a passenger forcibly opened it at Vito Cruz station, causing the sensor to malfunction. The train continued its journey with the door left open, and a passenger recorded this incident on camera.
 On February 20, 2018, at around 6:00am, a train at R. Papa station unloaded 120 passengers after the air pressure gauge inside the train malfunctioned. The operations returned to normal 30 minutes later.
 On July 21, 2018, at around 6:00 AM, a contact wire sparked near Libertad station. A provisional service between Roosevelt and United Nations stations were implemented. Normal operations resumed at 2:59 PM after the cable was fixed.
 On September 26, 2018, a faulty 1G train door was unable to open at the Balintawak station. A passenger pushed the door open and was able to disembark. The next passenger pushed the door but it abruptly closed on him but managed to get through.
 On October 3, 2019, a mechanical problem limited the LRT-1 operations between Monumento and Baclaran stations. The operations returned to normal at 1:50pm.
 On November 6, 2020, a 1G train car emitted smoke at Gil Puyat station at 2:00 PM due to a catenary fault. Passengers were evacuated, and the line implemented a provisional service from Balintawak to Central Terminal and vice versa. The situation normalized at 8:00 PM.
Operations normalized at 7:34am.
On February 17, 2023, operations were limited between Roosevelt and Gil Puyat due to electrical problems.

References

External links
 The LRT Line 1 System
 Light Rail Manila Corporation

Line 1
Light Rail Transit System Line 1
Transportation in Cavite
Light Rail Transit System Line 1
750 V DC railway electrification
RATP Group
Transdev
Transportation in Luzon
Railway lines opened in 1984
1984 establishments in the Philippines
Establishments by Philippine executive order